Artemas Wyman Sawyer (4 March 1827 – 5 August 1907) was an American Baptist minister and educator. He was the president of Acadia College (now Acadia University) in Nova Scotia, Canada from 1869 to 1896.

Born in West Haven, Vermont, the son of the Reverend Reuben Sawyer and Laura Wyman, Sawyer was educated at the New London Academy and received a Bachelor of Arts in 1847 from Dartmouth College. After teaching in Windsor, Vermont for three years he attended the Newton Theological Institute and graduated in 1853. He was then ordained a minister of Baptist church in Lawrence, Massachusetts.

From 1855 to 1860, he was a professor of classics at Acadia College. From 1860 to 1864, he was the pastor of Baptist church in Saratoga Springs, New York. He served as principal of New London Academy from 1864 to 1869. In 1869, he was appointed president of Acadia College succeeding John Mockett Cramp. He served until 1896.

He died in West Haven, Vermont in 1907.

Personal life
He married Maria E. Chase in 1858. The couple had five children. Notable is Everett Wyman Sawyer.

Selected works
Sawyer, A.W. Education of Women in Nova Scotia and New Brunswick: an Historical Sketch. Windsor: J.J. Anslow, Printer. N.d.

References

 

1827 births
1907 deaths
Baptist ministers from the United States
Canadian university and college chief executives
Dartmouth College alumni
People from West Haven, Vermont
19th-century American clergy